The Asian and Oceanian Stock Exchanges Federation (AOSEF), which is composed of 19 stock exchanges, originated in 1982 as an informal organization called the East Asian Stock Exchanges Conference (EASEC). It was first conceived as an organization to promote closer ties between the region’s exchanges and cooperation among them.

Members
 Australian Stock Exchange Ltd.
 Hong Kong Exchanges and Clearing Ltd.
 Hochiminh Stock Exchange
 Indonesia Stock Exchange
 Korea Exchange
 Bursa Malaysia
 BSE The Stock Exchange, Mumbai
 Mongolian Stock Exchange
 National Stock Exchange of India Limited
 New Zealand Exchange Limited
 Osaka Securities Exchange Co., Ltd.
 Philippine Stock Exchange, Inc.
 Shanghai Stock Exchange
 Shenzhen Stock Exchange
 Singapore Exchange Ltd.
 Taiwan Stock Exchange Corp.
 The Stock Exchange of Thailand
 Tokyo Stock Exchange, Inc.

References 

Stock exchanges in Asia